Prime Medical College (PMC) is a private medical school in Bangladesh, established in 2008. It is located in Pirzabad, on the western fringes of Rangpur. It is affiliated with University of Rajshahi under the Faculty of Medicine.

It offers a five-year course of study leading to a Bachelor of Medicine, Bachelor of Surgery (MBBS) degree. A one-year internship after graduation is compulsory for all graduates. The degree is recognised by the Bangladesh Medical and Dental Council.

History
Md. Akkas Ali Sarker established Prime Medical College in 2008. Instruction began in 2008.

Campus
The college is located in Pirzabad, on the western fringes of Rangpur, along the Rangpur–Badarganj road. The main buildings on campus are: an academic building, separate hostels for men and women, and Prime Medical College Hospital, the college's 750-bed teaching hospital.

A medical institute, and a nursing college share the campus. Prime Institute of Science and Medical Technology offers a four-year Bachelor of Science (BSc) degree in health technology (laboratory) under Rajshahi University's Faculty of Medicine, and a four-year diploma in medical technology under the State Medical Faculty (SMF), Dhaka. Prime Nursing College offers a four-year Basic Bachelor of Science in Nursing and a two-year Post-basic BSc in Nursing under Rajshahi University's Faculty of Medicine.

Organization and administration
The college is affiliated with Rajshahi University under the Faculty of Medicine. The chairman of the college is Shahina Akhter. The principal is Md. Noor Islam.

Academics
The college offers a five-year course of study, approved by the Bangladesh Medical and Dental Council (BMDC), leading to a Bachelor of Medicine, Bachelor of Surgery (MBBS) degree from Rajshahi University . After passing the final professional examination, there is a compulsory one-year internship. The internship is a prerequisite for obtaining registration from the BMDC to practice medicine. In October 2014, the Ministry of Health and Family Welfare capped admission and tuition fees at private medical colleges at 1,990,000 Bangladeshi taka (US$25,750 as of 2014) total for their five-year courses.

Admission for Bangladeshis to the MBBS programmes at all medical colleges in Bangladesh (government and private) is conducted centrally by the Directorate General of Health Services (DGHS). It administers a written multiple choice question exam simultaneously throughout the country. Candidates are admitted based primarily on their score on this test, although grades at Secondary School Certificate (SSC) and Higher Secondary School Certificate (HSC) level also play a part. 5% of seats are reserved for students from underprivileged backgrounds, and another 5% are reserved for the college's governing body. 30% are reserved for foreign students. Admission for foreign students is based on their SSC and HSC grades. As of July 2014, the college is allowed to admit 120 students annually.

See also
 List of medical colleges in Bangladesh

References

Medical colleges in Bangladesh
Hospitals in Bangladesh
Educational institutions established in 2008
2008 establishments in Bangladesh